Tobie Kendall Grant (1887–1968), known as Aunt Toby, was an American philanthropist in Georgia. She worked in the insurance business, was renowned for fortune telling, and was an African American community leader in Scottdale. She donated land for a park (Tobie Grant Park), recreation center, and library - all named for her.

Grant was a Republican Party delegate.

There is a Scottdale-Tobie Grant Homework Center and a Tobie Grant Manor, a low income housing development built in 1966 on 55 acres. It was slated for demolition in 2013. There is also a Tobie Grant Lane.

References

African-American people
Georgia (U.S. state) Republicans
1887 births
1968 deaths